Nasiruddin Yousuff is a Bangladeshi stage and film director. He won Bangladesh National Film Award for Best Director for the film Guerrilla (2011). He was awarded Ekushey Padak by the Government of Bangladesh in 2010 for his contribution to Bangladeshi theater. He was a freedom fighter, an urban guerrilla who fought for independence of Bangladesh.

Career
Yousuff, along with Selim Al Deen, founded "Dhaka Theatre" in 1973 and later "Bangladesh Gram Theatre". He is the organising secretary of Bangladesh Centre of International Theatre (BCITI). He served as the president and director of the Committee for Cultural Identity and Development (CIDC).

Works
 Ekattorer Jishu (1993)
 Alpha (2019)
 Guerrilla (2011)
 Shey Kotha Boley Jai

Personal life
Yousuff is married to artist Shimul Yousuf. Together they have a daughter Esha Yousuf.

References

External links
 

Living people
Bangladeshi theatre directors
Recipients of the Ekushey Padak
Best Film Directing Meril-Prothom Alo Critics Choice Award winners
Best Director National Film Award (Bangladesh) winners
Place of birth missing (living people)
Honorary Fellows of Bangla Academy
Best Screenplay National Film Award (Bangladesh) winners
1950 births